Mike McDermott may refer to:

Mike McDermott (athlete) (1893–1970), U.S. competitor in the 1912 Olympics
Mike McDermott (baseball) (1862–1943), American baseball player
Mike McDermott (character), a poker player played by Matt Damon in the 1998 film Rounders
Mike McDermott (politician) (born 1961), Republican member of the Maryland House of Delegates
Mick McDermott (born 1974), Northern Irish football player

See also
Michael McDermott (disambiguation)